Helene Moglen (1936-2018) was a feminist literary scholar and author at University of California at Santa Cruz.

Biography
Moglen was born in 1936 to a working class, Jewish family in Brooklyn, New York, the daughter of Edyth P. (née Levin) and Edward L. Rosenbaum. She has one sister. In 1957, she graduated with a B.A. in literature and philosophy from Bryn Mawr College; and in 1965, she graduated with a Ph.D. in English literature from Yale University. From 1966 to 1971, she taught at New York University and was active in the Civil Rights Movement joining the Congress of Racial Equality and Mississippi Freedom Democratic Party. She then went to teach English literature at State University of New York at Purchase. At Purchase, she became the president of the faculty and with other feminist teachers including Suzanne Kessler, Evelyn Fox Keller, and Esther Newton developed the first woman's studies program. In 1978, she accepted a position as dean of humanities and professor of literature at the University of California, Santa Cruz, becoming the first female dean in the University of California system. From 1978 to 1983, she served  as provost of Kresge College; from 1984 to 1989, served as chair of the women's studies program; and founded and directed the Feminist Research Focused Research Activity (1984–1989) and the Institute for Advanced Feminist Research (2003–2006). She established and chaired the university's first sexual harassment committee based on the Women Against Rape model.

Personal life
In 1957, she married Sig Moglen (died 2001) whom she had met as a teenager; they had three sons Eben Moglen, Seth Moglen, and Damon Moglen. Sheila Namir, Ph.D. became her partner in 2001 and they were married in 2016.
 Her niece is Julie Swetnick who accused U.S. Supreme Court nominee Brett Kavanaugh of committing sexual assault.

Bibliography
The Trauma of Gender: A Feminist Theory of the English Novel (February 5, 2001)
The Philosophical Irony of Laurence Sterne (June 1, 1975)
Charlotte Bronte: The Self Conceived

References

External links

1936 births
20th-century American Jews
American feminist writers
Yale University alumni
Bryn Mawr College alumni
Writers from Brooklyn
20th-century American women writers
21st-century American women writers
Living people
21st-century American Jews